Lee Jackson (born 1971) is a British novelist and historian.

Education and career
Jackson has a doctorate from Royal Holloway University of London and is a member of the Academic Advisory Board of the Dickens Museum. He is the creator of The Dictionary of Victorian London, a widely-used free educational resource, established in 2001, that brings together digitised primary sources relating to the social history of Victorian London.

Writing
Jackson has written novels, anthologies and non-fiction books, all of which focus upon the Victorian capital. In 2015, he was interviewed on NPR about his book Dirty Old London (Yale UP, 2014), a history of dirt, filth and pollution, described by the Guardian as "rich in wonderful contemporary details gleaned from newspapers and archives ... a vivid account of the enormous challenges faced by a city expanding at an unprecedented rate". Jackson was also interviewed in print for Der Spiegel He has written articles for History Today. In 2021, he lectured and recorded video content for the Thames Festival Trust about North Woolwich Pleasure Gardens, as featured in his book Palaces of Pleasure (Yale UP, 2019).

Bibliography

Fiction

Non-fiction

References 

21st-century British historians
British writers

1971 births
Living people